The  fourth season of the animated television series, Aqua Teen Hunger Force originally aired in the United States on Cartoon Network's late night programming block, Adult Swim. Season four started on December 4, 2005 with "Dirtfoot" and ended with "Carl Wash", with a total of thirteen episodes. "Carl Wash" originally made two unannounced stealth airings on December 22, 2006 and January 7, 2007 and later made its official debut on March 25, 2007. Aqua Teen Hunger Force is about the surreal adventures and antics of three anthropomorphic fast food items: Master Shake, Frylock, and Meatwad, who live together as roommates and frequently interact with their human next-door neighbor, Carl Brutananadilewski in a suburban neighborhood in South New Jersey. In May 2015, this season became available on Hulu Plus.

This is the final season to air before the 2007 release Aqua Teen Hunger Force Colon Movie Film for Theaters, a feature-length film based on the series. Episodes in season four were written and directed by Dave Willis and Matt Maiellaro. Almost every episode in this season features a special guest appearance, which continues a practice used in past seasons. During the airing of this season drummer Terence Yerves filed a lawsuit against Schoolly D and Cartoon Network, over claims that he had played a major role in writing the Aqua Teen Hunger Force theme song. This season has been made available on DVD, and other forms of home media, including on demand streaming.

Production
Every episode in this season was written and directed by series creators Dave Willis and Matt Maiellaro, who have both written and directed every episode of the series. All episodes originally aired in the United States on Cartoon Network's late night programming block, Adult Swim. This season was one of the original seasons branded under the Aqua Teen Hunger Force title before Willis and Maiellaro started using a different alternative title for each season in 2011. As with most seasons, several episodes originally aired outside of their production order.

Season four features "Deleted Scenes", the first 22-minute episode, which features several references to the feature-length film Aqua Teen Hunger Force Colon Movie Film for Theaters, which aired on December 18, 2005, years prior to the film's debut. This season also features "Grim Reaper Gutters,” which is the first clip-show for Aqua Teen Hunger Force; as well as the show's first TV-MA-rated episode ("Dickesode") and the first appearances of Dr. Wongburger and Handbanana.

Many episodes in season four were made during the late production of the Aqua Teen Hunger Force Colon Movie Film for Theaters and were spaced out more than any other season. Season four is the final season to air before the movie, the final season produced in 4:3 standard definition, and the final season to air when Jim Samples was running Cartoon Network (he resigned following the 2007 Boston Bomb Scare, when the series got national attention).

Lawsuit
During the airing of the fourth season in November 2006 Schoolly D and Cartoon Network were sued over the Aqua Teen Hunger Force theme music. A drummer by the name of Terence Yerves (who, as Terry Yerves, was credited with "live drums" for the theme in the series' end credits) claimed he had also written the theme music alongside Schoolly D in 1999 while working at the Meat Locker Studio. Yerves was aware the song would be used for a television series but did not approve of it being used for Aqua Teen Hunger Force. However, he did not file the copyright to the Library Of Congress until May 2006, several years after the series started airing in 2001. In the lawsuit Yerves demanded he receive $150,000 for every time the series was aired after the lawsuit was filled, he also demanded that all existing copies of the series' DVDs be impounded and for Aqua Teen Hunger Force to cease broadcast.
The case settled in May, 2007. No information as to settlement terms is publicly available.

Cast

In season four the main cast consisted of Dana Snyder who provided the voice of Master Shake, Carey Means who provided the voice of Frylock, and series co-creator Dave Willis who provided the voice of both Meatwad and Carl Brutananadilewski; and recurring character Ignignokt. Also featured appearances from Matt Maiellaro who voiced Err and Cybernetic Ghost of Christmas Past from the Future, George Lowe who voiced himself as various characters, Brendon Small voiced Dr. Wongburger, Andy Merrill who voiced Oglethorpe and Merle, and Mike Schatz who voiced Emory.

Season four featured various guest appearances from Billie Reaves in "Dirtfoot", Mike Bigga voiced Boost in "Boost Mobile", Tommy Blacha appeared in "Dickesode", Andrew W.K. voiced himself in "Party All the Time", Roberto Lange voiced Mucus man in "Global Grilling", and Tera Patrick voiced herself in "Grim Reaper Gutters", Bart Oates voiced himself in "Bart Oates", Patton Oswalt voiced Ezekial in "Ezekial". In "Carl Wash" Jim Fortier voiced both Carl and his son Carl Jr., both characters had originally appeared in the 1999 Space Ghost Coast to Coast episode "Chambraigne".

Broadcast history
"Carl Wash" was originally scheduled to air on January 7, 2007, but was aired early and without announcement on December 22, 2006 during the 3:30 a.m. time slot. It was played once more on January 21, before Adult Swim officially aired this episode on March 25, 2007. The earlier broadcasts included a rough audio track, whereas the later, "official" airing contained finished audio. Also, on the original version, parts of the screen were not shown, such as, when Meatwad is talking to the brains, in the finished version, Carl Jr. is entirely shown, however, in the rough version, part of Carl Jr. is not shown.

Episodes

Home release

The entire fourth season was released on the Aqua Teen Hunger Force Volume Five DVD on January 29, 2008. The set was released by Adult Swim and distributed by Warner Home Video, and features special features including the online video game The Worst Game Ever, and deleted scenes. The set was later released in Region 4 by Madman Entertainment on April 1, 2009. The set was released in Region 2 on January 31, 2011. "Deleted Scenes" was also released as a special feature on the Aqua Teen Hunger Force Colon Movie Film for DVD set along with the movie on August 14, 2007.

With the exception of "Deleted Scenes", this season was also released under the label "Season 5" on iTunes, the Xbox Live Marketplace, and Amazon Video under the label "Volume 5". The iTunes release also features a special music video, "I Like Your Booty But I'm Not Gay".

See also
 List of Aqua Teen Hunger Force episodes
Aqua Teen Hunger Force

References

External links

 Aqua Teen Hunger Force at Adult Swim
 Aqua Teen Hunger Force season 4 at the Internet Movie Database

2005 American television seasons
2006 American television seasons
Aqua Teen Hunger Force seasons